Roig's pericote or Roig's chaco mouse (Andalgalomys roigi) is a species of rodent in the family Cricetidae. Its karyotype has 2n = 60 and FN = 120. It may be a subspecies of Olrog's chaco mouse.

References

Andalgalomys
Mammals of Argentina
Mammals described in 1996
Taxobox binomials not recognized by IUCN